Barbas, the Demon of Fear, is a fictional character cast as a major foe (an upper level demon in the Charmed universe) from the WB Television Network television series Charmed, who had the ability to sense his opponents' greatest fears to use against them. He was played by Billy Drago and repeatedly plotted against the Charmed Ones—the three sisters who are powerful good witches, and the main characters of the television series.

Episode appearance 

 "From Fear to Eternity"
 Season 1, Episode 13, first shown 10 February 1999
 Barbas makes his first appearance on Friday the 13th. His plan is to kill 13 unmarried witches, by using their greatest fears to scare them to death before midnight, or else he will remain trapped in the underworld. If he succeeds, he will earn the chance to wreak havoc on the world, every single day. Prue Halliwell believes she vanquishes him by overcoming her fear when he targets her, but it is later revealed he is not dead but in purgatory.

 "Ms. Hellfire"
 Season 2, Episode 9, first shown 13 January 2000:
 It is another Friday the 13th, and Barbas somehow manages to return, angry at the sisters for previously having defeated him. It is revealed that if he is able to defeat the Charmed Ones, he will be able to leave Purgatory. However, Barbas is stuck in Purgatory and unable to kill the sisters himself, so he hires Bane Jessup and Ms. Hellfire, two assassins, to kill the sisters for him. Prue repels the bullets using her powers, killing Ms. Hellfire and Bane is later caught and ends up in jail, which leaves Barbas in Purgatory.

 "Sympathy for the Demon"
 Season 5, Episode 7, first shown 3 November 2002
 After learning how to astral project, Barbas manipulates Cole Turner, an on-again/off-again ally of the Charmed Ones, into getting rid of his powers. After Barbas takes those powers, he frees himself from Purgatory. He attacks the sisters at their home, using their fears against them. Eventually Paige is able to expose him with a potion that strips Barbas of the stolen powers and gives them back to Cole. After the powers are returned, Cole vanquishes Barbas by shooting him with an energy ball.

 "Crimes and Witch Demeanors"
 Season 6, Episode 18, first shown 25 April 2004
 Barbas returns, brought back from Purgatory by a Tribunal of powerful good and evil leaders to prosecute the sisters' for misusing magic. However, he actually set up the sisters by possessing people with phantasms, leading to magic being exposed. In the end, his plot is revealed, but he proves that Phoebe has been reckless with her magic, and the Tribunal temporally strips her powers. As a stipulation of the trial, Barbas is freed from Purgatory because he won the case. The episode ends with Barbas a bigger threat than ever to the sisters, as he also discovers the Elder Gideon's worst fear, that others will find out that Gideon plans to kill Wyatt Halliwell, Piper's and Leo's son. Barbas promises to keep the secret.

 "It's a Bad, Bad, Bad, Bad World (Part 1)" /  "It's a Bad, Bad, Bad, Bad World (Part 2)"
 Season 6, Episode 22–23 (double-hour season finale), first shown 16 May 2004
 The sisters are accidentally sent to a parallel world where evil is dominant. They encounter evil versions of themselves and a good version of Barbas (who they know as the Demon of Fear) but in the twisted reality he is the Demon of Hope. The good version of Barbas reveals that his counterpart and Gideon are working together to kill Wyatt. The evil Charmed Ones send their counterparts home, and work to stop Barbas and Gideon. Leo eventually tracks down and kills Gideon to restore balance to both worlds, while Barbas secretly watches.

 "A Call to Arms"
 Season 7, Episode 1, first shown 12 September 2004
 Tracked by Leo for conspiring with Gideon, Barbas tries to kill the sisters by infecting Piper and Leo with their worst fears. Although he manipulates Leo into killing an Elder, he fails yet again to kill the sisters as Phoebe and Paige out with him. They make a strong vanquishing potion, using it against Barbas. Before being vanquished, however, Barbas states that he will return again because "fear always comes back."

See also 
 Barbas

Episode footnotes

References 

Charmed (TV series) characters
Charmed (TV series) demons
Television characters introduced in 1999
Male characters in television